In mathematics, a piecewise algebraic space is a generalization of a semialgebraic set, introduced by Maxim Kontsevich and Yan Soibelman. The motivation was for the proof of Deligne's conjecture on Hochschild cohomology. Robert Hardt, Pascal Lambrechts, Victor Turchin, and Ismar Volić later developed the theory.

References 
 
 Maxim Kontsevich and Yan Soibelman. “Deformations of algebras over operads and the Deligne conjecture”. In: Conférence Moshé Flato 1999, Vol. I (Dijon). Vol. 21. Math. Phys. Stud. Dordrecht: Kluwer Acad. Publ., 2000, pp. 255–307. arXiv: math/0001151.

Algebraic geometry